The No 8 mine is a South African circular plastic cased minimum metal anti-tank blast mine. The mine has a large pressure plate on top of which is an oversize arming lever whose position at either of two sets of lugs either indicates "ARMED" or "SAFE". The mine can be fitted with a number of electronic anti-handling devices as well as seismic and magnetic influence devices. The mine is found in Angola, Namibia, Zambia, and Zimbabwe.

Specifications
 Diameter: 259 mm
 Height: 175 mm
 Weight: 7.4 kg
 Explosive content: 7 kg of a 60/40 RDX/TNT mix.
 Operating pressure: 150 to 220 kg

References
 Jane's Mines and Mine Warfare 2005-2006

Anti-tank mines